All That Matters is an uptempo pop-dance song released by UK singer Louise in 1998 from her second album Woman In Me. The single peaked at no 11 on the UK charts. The single was also remixed for the clubs by Hex Hector and DJ Tonka, whose version was also featured in the 1999 US Dance compilation "Pop Goes Dance."

Track listings

UK CD 1 single
All That Matters (Radio Mix) 3:27 	
Woman In Me 3:43 	
When Will My Heart Beat Again 4:01 	
Louise Answerphone Message 0:14 	

UK/Europe CD 2 single
All That Matters (Radio Mix) 3:27 	
All That Matters (DJ Tonka Mix) 7:08 	
All That Matters (Cas Roc Vocal Mix) 6:22 	
All That Matters (Hex Hector Vocal Mix) 6:38 	
All That Matters (Hyper Go Go Vocal Mix) 6:21 	
All That Matters (The Almighty Mix) 6:17

References

1998 singles
Louise Redknapp songs
1997 songs
EMI Records singles